The following squads were named for the 1937 South American Championship that took place in Argentina.

Argentina
 Fernando Bello
 Juan Estrada
 Bartolomé Colombo
 Alberto Cuello
 Luis Fazio
 Juan Carlos Iribarren
 Celestino Martínez
 Oscar Tarrío
 Ernesto Lazzatti
 Antonio Sastre
 Alejandro Scopelli
 Roberto Cherro
 Vicente de la Mata
 Bernabé Ferreyra
 Enrique García
 Enrico Guaita
 José María Minella
 Carlos Peucelle
 Francisco Varallo
 Alberto Zozaya

Brazil
 Jurandir
 Rey
 Britto
 Carnera
 Jaú
 Afonsinho
 Alberto Zarzur
 Brandão
 Canalli
 Luisinho Oliveira
 Nariz
 Tim
 Tunga
 Bahia
 Cardeal
 Carreiro
 Carvalho Leite
 Niginho
 Patesko
 Roberto

Chile
 Luis Cabrera
 Eugenio Soto
 Mario Baeza
 Jorge Córdova
 Ascanio Cortés
 Guillermo Gornall
 Guillermo Riveros
 Manuel Arancibia
 Juan Montero
 Luis Ponce
 José Avendaño
 Moisés Avilés
 Arturo Carmona
 Tomás Ojeda
 Eduardo Schneeberger
 Raúl Toro
 Guillermo Torres

Paraguay
 Francisco Aguirre
 Juan Simón Amarilla
 Diego Ayala
 Marcial Barrios
 Adolfo Erico
 Eligio Esquivel
 Rogelio Etcheverry
 Martín Flor
 Aurelio González
 Manuel González
 Antonio Invernizzi
 Juan Félix Lezcano
 Raúl Núñez Velloso
 Quiterio Olmedo
 Amadeo Ortega
 Miguel Ortega
 Lorenzo Romero
 Flaminio Silva
 Alberto Vera

Peru
 Jorge Alcalde
 Teodoro Alcalde
 Andrés Alvarez
 Vicente Arce
 Segundo Castillo
 Ricardo del Río
 Arturo Fernández
 Teodoro Fernández
 Juan Honores
 Marcos Huby
 Pedro Ibáñez
 Orestes Jordán
 José María Lavalle
 Adolfo Magallanes
 José Morales
 Arturo Paredes
 Carlos Portal
 Alberto Soria
 Carlos Tovar
 Juan Humberto Valdivieso
 Alejandro Villanueva

Uruguay
 Enrique Ballestrero
 Juan Bautista Besuzzo
 Avelino Cadilla
 Carlos Martínez
 Agenor Muñiz
 Rodolfo Carreras
 Eugenio Galvalisi
 Juan Píriz
 Ulises Borges
 Adelaido Camaití
 Eduardo Ithurbide
 Juan José Rosselli
 Severino Varela
 Segundo Villadóniga

References

Squads
Copa América squads